James Bernard Schafer (1896 – April 26, 1955) was a man primarily known as the founder of a cult known as the Royal Fraternity of Master Metaphysicians and by an attempt to raise an "immortal baby".

Early years

Press coverage of Schafer in connection with the Royal
Fraternity of Master Metaphysicians mentions that he
was born in Fargo, North Dakota, had a medical degree
 
and that he had been a member of the Ku Klux Klan.

Royal Fraternity of Master Metaphysicians
The origin of the organization is obscure.
Its name doesn't appear in newspapers until 1938, when it
made a noteworthy real estate purchase. 
In subsequent press accounts the origin is stated to be in "the 1920s" 
with a membership in "the thousands" by the 1930s. It is also
stated that it attracted mostly
middle-aged women. An inner circle of male members known as "The Storks" made layettes for "needy, expectant mothers".

On January 13, 1938, the group purchased the 24-acre Idle Hour estate of William Kissam Vanderbilt on Long Island. Schafer renamed it "Peace Haven", and opened it as a retreat for those who purchased a "fellowship", the price of which was initially $100 ( dollars) but ballooned to $500 by the end of 1940.

Pepperidge Hall, former mansion of Christopher R. Robert, was nearly purchased by the group in 1939. However, the sale later fell through.

A building at 217 W. 57th Street, built by Jay Gould as a stable, was purchased by the group in February 1940 as the location for an auditorium. The group also purchased the Adelphi Theatre, changed its name to the "Radiant Center", and put on metaphysical plays there.

The immortal baby
In November 1939, Schafer announced his intention to bring Baby Jean, whose mother, a waitress named Catherine Gauntt, was too poor to raise her, into the mansion and prepare her for everlasting life through metaphysics and a special vegetable diet. It was intended that she eventually become the group's immortal leader. However, the experiment terminated early, in December 1940, when they returned Baby Jean to her parents, citing both her parents' wishes and the cost. Later, her mother filed suit. Grand larceny charges were also filed by the New York Attorney General, John J. Bennett, Jr.

Questions centered on various lawsuits filed by others against the group and also Baby Jean's property, which included a diamond ring supposedly valued at $50,000.

The group encountered financial difficulties during the trial and Peace Haven was foreclosed and auctioned off.

On March 24, 1942, Schafer pleaded guilty and was sent to Sing Sing on May 5 for a term of at least 5 years. During that time, he lost Peace Haven, which is now part of Dowling College. Upon his release, he opened a correspondence school in metaphysics in upstate New York and published a magazine devoted to metaphysical issues.

Later years

On April 26, 1955, Schafer and his wife Cecilia were found dead in their car on the grounds of his school.  There was a suicide note on the seat beside them, detailing instructions for their daughter on how to continue operating the school. It also stated that they had "no other way out." Schafer was 59. His wife was 55.

Works

See also 
 Napoleon Hill

References

External links 

Peace Haven Bibliography LI South Shore History, Diane Holliday

1896 births
1955 deaths
American confidence tricksters
Suicides by carbon monoxide poisoning
Suicides in New York (state)
People from Fargo, North Dakota
University of Michigan Medical School alumni
1955 suicides